Puig de Sant Miquel is a  mountain in the Serra de Tramuntana of Majorca. It is included in the municipality of Alaró of the autonomous community of the Balearic Islands.
The Puig de Sant Miquel is located between s'Alcadena and the Finca Solleric, near the old path to Orient.

References

Mountains of Mallorca
Mountains of the Balearic Islands